Ch'uñawi (Aymara for a place where potatoes are spread as part of the procedure to prepare ch'uñu, also spelled Chunahui) is a  mountain in the Cordillera Real in the Andes of Bolivia It lies in the La Paz Department, Murillo Province, La Paz Municipality, northeast of the city of La Paz. Ch'uñawi is situated northwest of Mik'aya and Wak'ani and northeast of Jamp'aturi.

References 

Mountains of La Paz Department (Bolivia)